In humans, males and females differ in their strategies to acquire mates and focus on certain qualities. There are two main categories of strategies that both sexes utilize: short-term and long-term. Human mate choice, an aspect of sexual selection in humans, depends on a variety of factors, such as ecology, demography, access to resources, rank/social standing, genes, and parasite stress.

While there are a few common mating systems seen among humans, the amount of variation in mating strategies is relatively large. This is due to how humans evolved in diverse niches that were geographically and ecologically expansive. This diversity, as well as cultural practices and human consciousness, have all led to a large amount of variation in mating systems. Below are some of the overarching trends of mate choice.

Female mate choice 
Although human males and females are both selective in deciding with whom to mate, females exhibit more mate choice selectivity than males, as is seen in nature. Relative to most other animals however, female and male mating strategies are found to be more similar to each other. According to Bateman's principle of Lifespan Reproductive Success (LRS), human females display the least variance of the two sexes in their LRS due to their high obligatory parental investment, that is a nine-month gestational period, as well as lactation following birth in order to feed offspring so that their brain can grow to the required size.

Human female sexual selection can be examined by looking at ways in which males and females are sexually dimorphic, especially in traits that serve little other evolutionary purpose. For example, male traits such as the presence of beards, overall lower voice pitch, and average greater height are thought to be sexually selected traits as they confer benefits to either the women selecting for them, or to their offspring. Experimentally, women have reported a preference for men with beards and lower voices.

Female mate choice hinges on many different coinciding male traits, and the trade-off between many of these traits must be assessed. The ultimate traits most salient to female human mate choice, however, are parental investment, resource provision and the provision of good genes to offspring. Many phenotypic traits are thought to be selected for as they act as an indication of one of these three major traits. The relative importance of these traits when considering mate selection differ depending on the type of mating arrangement females engage in. Human women typically employ long-term mating strategies when choosing a mate, however they also engage in short-term mating arrangements, so their mate choice preferences change depending on the function of the type of arrangement.

Short-term mating strategies 
Women do not always seek and engage in long-term mating arrangements. This is evidenced by many men's tendencies to seek multiple sexual partners—a trait that could not have evolved if women were not also engaging in short-term arrangements—and by the tendency of some women to pursue affairs outside of their long-term couple pairings.

David Buss outlines several hypotheses as to the function of women's short-term mate choices:
 Resource hypothesis: Women may engage in short-term mating in order to gain resources that they may not be able to gain from a long-term partner, or that a long-term partner may not be able to provide consistently. These resources may be food, protection for the woman and her children from aggressive men who may capture or sexually coerce them, or status, by providing the woman with a higher social standing. Women may also benefit from having several short-term mating arrangements through paternity confusion—if the paternity of her offspring is not certain, she may be able to accrue resources from several men as a result of this uncertainty.
 Genetic benefit hypothesis: Women may choose to engage in short-term mating arrangements in order to aid conception if her long-term partner is infertile, to gain superior genes to those of her long-term partner, or to acquire different genes to those of her partner and increase the genetic diversity of her offspring. This relates to what is known as the sexy son hypothesis; if a woman acquires genes from a high quality male, her offspring will likely have higher mate value, resulting in their increased reproductive success.
 Mate expulsion and mate switching: Women may engage in a short-term mating arrangement in order to cause an end to a long-term relationship; in other words, to facilitate a break-up. Women may also use short-term mating if their current partner has depreciated in value, and they wish to 'trade up' and find a partner that they believe has higher value.
 Short-term for long-term goals: Women may use short-term sexual relationships in order to assess a mate's value as a long-term partner, or in the hopes that the short-term arrangement will result in one that is long-term.

Long-term mating strategies 
While there has been evidence and research to support the existence of short-term mating in women, it has nevertheless been shown that women prefer long-term partners over short-term mates. This preference is due to women's tendency to invest and require more energy for parental care. In long-term mating arrangements, women typically look for males who will provide a high level of parental investment, and who can provide resources to the woman or to her offspring. The provision of economic resources, or the potential to acquire many economic resources, is the most obvious cue towards the ability of a man to provide resources, and women in the United States have been shown experimentally to rate the importance of their partner's financial status more highly than men. However, many other traits exist that may act as cues towards a man's ability to provide resources that have been sexually selected for in women's evolutionary history. These include older age—older males have had more time to accrue resources—industriousness, dependability and stability—if a woman's long-term partner is not emotionally stable or is not dependable then their provision of resources to her and her offspring are likely to be inconsistent. Additionally, the costs associated with an emotionally unstable partner such as jealousy and manipulation may outweigh the benefits associated with the resources they are able to provide.

Women's mate choice is not as straightforward as selecting a mate that displays all of her desired qualities. Often, potential mates will possess some qualities that are desirable and some that are not, so women must assess the relative costs and benefits of their potential partners' traits and 'trade off'. Women's mate choices will also be constrained by the context in which they are making them, resulting in conditional mate choices. Some of the conditions that may influence female mate choice include the woman's own perceived attractiveness, the woman's personal resources, mate copying and parasite stress. Romantic love is the mechanism through which long-term mate choice occurs in human females.

Male mate choice 
Generally, it is unusual for males within a species to be the choosy sex. There are many reasons for this. In humans, following sexual reproduction, the female is obliged to endure a nine-month pregnancy and childbirth. This means that females have a greater obligatory parental investment to offspring, than males. Human males have a larger quantity of gametes than females, which are replenished at a rate of approximately 12 million per hour. Conversely, female humans are born with a fixed amount of egg cells which are not restocked over the lifespan. This provides males with a greater window of opportunity to mate and reproduce than females, hence females are usually more choosy.

As there is mutual mate choice in humans, men are influenced by certain traits when deciding for potential partners. They are less choosy than women in short-term mating as the perceived parental investment is low as they do not have an obligatory parental investment but equally choosy as women in long-term mating as men then invest heavily in the offspring in form of resource provisioning and support, meaning that the parental investment is equally high.

Short-term mating strategies 

When finding a short-term mate, males highly value women with sexual experience and physical attractiveness. Men seeking short-term sexual relationships are likely to avoid women who are interested in commitment or require investment. In short-term sexual relationships, men are less choosy because of low parental investment. 

Examples of short-term mating strategies in males:
 Multiple sexual partners: When looking for short-term sexual relationships, men may wish for there to be as little time as possible between each partner. 
 Physical attractiveness: Men who are interested in a short-term sexual relationship are more likely to prioritise information about the body of potential partners, rather than their faces. When finding a female for a short-term relationship, compared with a long-term relationship, males are less likely to prioritise factors such as commitment.
 Relaxation of standards: It has been reported that men are more likely to engage in a sexual relationship with women who have lower levels of intelligence, independence, honesty, generosity, athleticism, responsibility and cooperativeness, when this relationship is short-term. Men may be more accepting of lower standards, than what they usually prefer, because they are not entering a long-term relationship with this person. 
 Sexual experience: Many men assume that women who have engaged in sexual experiences beforehand are likely to have a higher sex drive than women who haven't. These women may also be more accessible and require less courtship.

Long-term mating strategies 

Humans have the ability to rely on biological signals of reproductive success and non-biological signals, such as the female's willingness to marry. Unlike many animals, humans are not able to consciously display physical changes to their body when they are ready to mate, so they have to rely on other forms of communication before engaging in a consensual relationship. Romantic love is the mechanism through which long-term mate choice occurs in human males. For long-term sexual relationships, men are usually equally choosy because they have a similar parental investment like the women, as they heavily invest in the offspring in form of resource provisioning. 

Males may look for:
 Commitment and marriage: A human male may be interested in mating with a female who seeks marriage. This is because he has exclusive sexual access to the female, so any offspring produced in the relationship will be genetically related to him (unless the female has sexual intercourse with another male outside of the marriage). This increases the likelihood of paternity certainty. With two married parents investing in the offspring, their chance of survival may increase; therefore the male's DNA will be passed on to the children of his offspring. Also, a male who is interested in committing to a female may be more attractive to potential mates. A male who can promise resources and future parental investment is likely to be more appealing to women than a male who is unwilling to commit to her. 
 Facial symmetry: Symmetrical faces have been judged to signal good general health and the ability for a woman to withstand adverse environmental factors, such as illness. 
 Femininity: A feminine face can be a signal of youth, which in turn signals strong reproductive value. As a woman gets older, her facial features become less feminine due to ageing. Femininity can also be linked to disease-resistance and high estrogen levels, which are factors that suggest reproductive value to a potential mate.
 Physical beauty: Observable characteristics of a woman can indicate good health and the ability to reproduce, qualities which are likely to be desired by a male. This may include smooth skin, absence of lesions, muscle tone, long hair and high energy levels. 
 Waist-to-hip ratio: A waist-to-hip ratio of 0.7 is an indicator of fertility, lower long-term health risks and suggests that the woman isn't already pregnant. A male is likely to desire these qualities in a mate, as it will increase the chance of survival of any offspring the couple have together.
 Breasts: Men typically prefer women who have larger breasts because it is a sign of being 20–24 years of age. A woman in this age range is perceived to be more fertile, sexually mature, and reproductively healthy. Larger breasts are also an indicator of having a higher body fat percentage which secures more energy to provide nutrients to the fetus during gestation as well as increase the productivity of lactation. Although breast size is of importance to male attraction because it is very prominent, areola pigment is also found to be significant. As women age and take part in more pregnancies, their areolae become darker in pigment. Therefore, darker areolae are seen to be more attractive as they indicate that the woman is capable of successfully birthing healthy children. This is however only seen to be attractive in women with larger breasts. If a woman has breasts that are small or medium-sized, a lighter areola is preferred by men because the areola lightens as a woman goes through puberty. This way, she is still seen to be fertile, she just may not be assumed to be as sexually mature and reproductively healthy as a woman with larger breasts and darker areolae.
 Youth: Both young and old men are attracted to women in their twenties. Faces that appear younger are usually rated as more attractive by males. This could include faces with clear skin and a lack of wrinkles as well as whiter eyes and redder cheeks and lips. A female who appears younger is likely to be appealing to mates, as it suggests that she has a higher reproductive value than alternative, older, females.

Parasite stress on mate choice 

The parasite-stress theory, otherwise known as pathogen stress, states that parasites or diseases put stress on the life development of an organism, leading to a change in the appearance of their sexually attractive traits. The initial research on the Hamilton–Zuk hypothesis (see indicator traits) showed that, within one species (brightly colored birds), there was greater sexual selection for males that had brighter plumage (feathers). In addition, Hamilton and Zuk showed that, comparing across multiple species, there is greater selection for physical attributes in species under greater parasitic stress. This has influenced research regarding human mate choice.

In societies with a high prevalence of parasites or pathogens, members would derive greater evolutionary advantage from selecting for physical attractiveness/good looks in mate choice compared to that derived by members of societies with lower prevalence. Humans could use physical attractiveness to determine resistance to parasites and diseases, which are believed to lower their sufferers’ ability to portray attractive traits from then on and limit the number of high-quality pathogen-resistant mates. In cultures where parasitic infection is especially high, members could use cues available to them to determine the physical health status of the potential mate. Regardless of the wealth or ideology, the females in areas that are more at risk or have higher rates of parasites and diseases would weigh masculinity more highly when rating potential mates.
 Scarification: In pre-industrial societies, body markings such as tattoos or scarifications are predicted to have been a way in which individuals could attract potential mates, by indicating the reproductive quality of a person. Meaning, scars on the body could be viewed by prospective mates as evidence that a person has overcome parasites and is thus more attractive to potential mates. Research investigating this hypothesis (Singh and Bronstad 1997) found that in instances of increased pathogen prevalence, the only anatomical area with evidence of scarification in females was found on the stomach, with no evidence found for male scarification.
 Masculinity: In societies where there are high levels of parasites or diseases, the females, as the overall health of members decreases, are predicted to increasingly emphasize masculinity in their mate preferences. Women look for signs of masculinity in areas such as the voice, face and body shape of males. The face, in particular, may hold several cues for parasitic resistance and has been the subject of most attractiveness research.
 Polygamy: Tropical areas were originally associated with polygynous societies as a result of the surrounding environment being both ecologically richer and homogeneous. However, whilst tropical areas were associated with polygamy, pathogen stress is predicted as a better indicator of polygamy and has been positively correlated with it. Furthermore, over the course of human evolution, areas which had high levels of parasite-stress may have shifted the polygamy threshold and increased the presence of certain types of polygamy in a society.

Criticisms 

Gangested and Buss (2009) say that research indicates that parasite stress may have only influenced mate choice through females searching for "good genes" which show parasite resistance, in areas which have high prevalence of parasites. John Cartwright also points out that females may be simply avoiding the transmission of parasites to themselves rather than it being them choosing males with good genes and that females look for more than just parasite-resistant genes.

MHC-correlated mate choice 

Major histocompatibility complex (MHC) or, in humans, human leukocyte antigen (HLA) produces proteins that are essential for immune system functioning. The genes of the MHC complex have extremely high variability, assumed to be a result of frequency-dependent parasite-driven selection and mate choice. This is believed to be so it promotes heterozygosity improving the chances of survival for the offspring.

Odor preferences 
In experiments using rats, MHC-associated mate choice indicated that odor cues played a role. In humans, there is conflicting evidence about whether men and women will rate the opposite genders odor as more pleasant, if the potential mate has MHC-dissimilar antigens to them. However, women on contraceptive pills rate the odor of MHC-similar men as being more pleasant, it is unknown why women on contraceptive pills rate smell in this way. It was found that when processing MHC-similar smells were processed faster.  Contrary to these findings, other studies have found that there is no correlation between attraction and odor by testing males' odor preferences on women's odors.  The study concludes that there is no correlation in attraction between men and women of dissimilar HLA proteins.  Research completed on a Southern Brazilian student population resulted in similar findings that found significant differences in the attraction ratings of giving to male sweat and MHC-difference.

Facial preferences 
Human facial preferences have been shown to correlate with both MHC-similarity and MHC-heterozygosity. Research into MHC-similarity with regards to facial attractiveness is limited but research so far suggests that women, when thinking of long-term relationships, will choose males who are MHC-similar. While facial asymmetry hasn't been correlated with MHC-heterozygosity, the perceived healthiness of skin appears to be. It appears to be that only MHC-heterozygosity and no other genetic markers are correlated with facial attractiveness in males and it has been shown that so far that there is no correlation that has been found in females.  Slightly different from facial attractiveness, facial masculinity is not shown to correlate with MHC heterogeneity (a common measure of immunocompetence).

Criticisms 
A review article published in June 2018 concluded that there is no correlation between HLA and mate choice. In addition to assessing previous studies on HLA-Mate choice analysis to identify errors in their research methods (such as small population sizes), the study collects a larger set of data and re-runs the analysis of the previous studies.  By using the larger data set to conduct analysis on 30 couples of European descent, they generate findings contrary to previous studies that identified significant divergence in the mate choice with accordance to HLA genotyping. Additional studies have been conducted simultaneously on African and European populations that only show correlation of MHC divergence in European but not African populations.

References 

Evolutionary biology